Alcidion sannio is a species of longhorn beetle of the subfamily Lamiinae. It was described by Ernst Friedrich Germar in 1824 and is known from Brazil.

References

Beetles described in 1824
Endemic fauna of Brazil
Alcidion